Irene Peirano Garrison is an American philologist and Pope Professor of the Latin Language and Literature at Harvard University. She is known for her works on  Roman poetry and its relation to rhetoric, literary criticism and scholarship, both ancient and modern.

Books
 The Rhetoric of the Roman Fake: Latin Pseudepigrapha in context (CUP, 2012)
 Persuasion, Rhetoric and Roman Poetry (CUP, 2019)

References

External links

Living people
Harvard University faculty
Philology
Alumni of the University of Oxford
Harvard University alumni
Year of birth missing (living people)